Malonyl-S-ACP:biotin-protein carboxyltransferase (malonyl-S-acyl-carrier protein:biotin-protein carboxyltransferase, MadC/MadD, MadC,D, malonyl-[acyl-carrier protein]:biotinyl-[protein] carboxyltransferase) is an enzyme with systematic name malonyl-(acyl-carrier protein):biotinyl-(protein) carboxytransferase. This enzyme catalyses the following chemical reaction

 malonyl-[acyl-carrier protein] + biotinyl-[protein]  acetyl-[acyl-carrier protein] + carboxybiotinyl-[protein]

This enzyme is a component of EC 4.1.1.89, biotin-dependent malonate decarboxylase.

References

External links 
 

EC 2.1.3